Jon Redwine (born Oak Cliff, Texas) is an American hip hop, R&B, and pop music producer. Active since 2006, he's worked with musicians such as Tinashe, Chris Brown, Bobby Brackins, G-eazy, Zendaya, REDi, Waka Flocka Flame, Mario, Ludacris, Tabi Bonney, Christina Milian, Jeremih, Colette Carr, MKTO, Jake Miller

Early life, education
Born in the late 1980s, Jon Redwine was raised by his parents in Oak Cliff, Texas. He came from a musical background, as the great nephew of Don Albert and early on listened to musicians such as Marvin Gaye, Donny Hathaway, Jimmy Scott, and Duke Ellington. He later began listening to bands such as Confunkshun and Kanye West. He first started taking music seriously at age 13 as a DJ.

Redwine attended the University of St. Thomas in Saint Paul, Minnesota from 2004 to 2008 on a full academic scholarship, where he earned a bachelor's degree in electronic music production and business entrepreneurship. He also attended the University of Minnesota during the same time period where he gained membership into Alpha Phi Alpha fraternity. He started writing earnestly again as a sophomore in college, after deciding to focus on the interest he took most personally.

Music career

Production
Redwine became CFO, owner, and founder of Ten|82 in 2006, while still attending college. He's also been a composer for Redwine Entertainment since 2007, and co-founded the production team 2085, which consists of Redwine and the songwriter singer Robby Blackwell, also from Oak Cliff, Texas. After graduation Redwine moved to Los Angeles with no funding, and soon started operating a production studio in Santa Monica.

His songwriting and production work covers multiple genres. Redwine was classically trained in college, and both scores for orchestra and can play all instruments based on the western scale. His work is typically based on live instruments with a heavy focus on synths and guitars.

Starting in January 2012, he worked as a producer for Warner Music Group, and has also done production for Sony Music Entertainment, Def Jam and Disney. Artist contributions include Mario, Tabi Bonney and Loick Essien, He regularly worked with singer-songwriter and fellow Texan Robby Blackwell, and composed and produced several tracks on the album Fresh by rapper Tabi Bonney in 2010. Other projects include Sabi on Warner Brothers, Colette Carr on Cherry Tree-Interscope, and Cassie Ventura.

He also became owner of FLYP'T Technologies in May 2009. The company produces iFlyp't, an iPhone app that allows fans to experience recording with particular artists.

REDi
Redwine became a founding member of REDi (pronounced red-eye) in 2012 in Los Angeles. The urban pop ensemble includes Redwine, Robby Blackwell, and rapper Aundrus Poole. The members met as collaborators with Redwine, and according to Blackwell: "We were all working with Redwine and respected each other's music...so it just made sense for us to further our collaborations with a group."

The group made their debut performance in March 2012 at SXSW in Austin, Texas,. where they performed after groups such as Dawn Richard and 9th Wonder. They released their debut single "Light the Club" in May 2012, and their debut mixtape, Red Pill, was released in November 2012. It was produced by Redwine.

Discography

Albums
  Use to Love by Mario (Unreleased Album)
2012: Red Pill with REDi
 2012: Visitor Mixtape by V. Bozeman – production
 2012: Triple F Life by Waka Flocka Flame – production
2013: Rockabyebaby mixtape by Cassie Ventura – Worked vocally on production

Singles
2010: ""Fever" from 'Fresh by Tabi Bonney ft Raheem Devaguhn
2010: "The Come Up" from ''''Fresh by Tabi Bonney
2010: "Nuthin but a Hero" from 'Fresh by Tabi Bonney
 2012: "Candy Paint and Gold Teeth" by Waka Flocka ft Ludacris and BunB
2012: "Light the Club" with REDi
2012: "Poison" by Veronika Bozeman
2012: "Time to get sexy" by Veronika Bozeman
2012: "Feelin on your booty" by Veronika Bozeman
2012: "Knockin the Boots" by Veronika Bozeman
2013: "Ham" by Colette Carr
2014: "2on" by Tinashe ft School Boy Q
2014: "Jersey" by Bella Thorne
2014: "Hot Box" by Bobby Brackins ft G-Eazy and Mila J
2014: "Came to Do" by Chris Brown ft Akon
2015: "Post to Be" performed by Omarion, Chris Brown, and Jhené Aiko
2015: "Tumbao" by Kat Dahlia,
2015: "Ain't Bout To Do" by Diggy Simmons ft French Montana
2015: "My Jam" by Bobby Brackins ft Jeremih and Zendaya,
2015: "Selfish Girls" by Jake Miller
2015: "Blood on My Hands" by Chris Brown,
2016: "Lost My Way" by Max Schneider
2016: "Hands Off My Heart/Places You Go" by MKTO
2016: "Bang Bang" by Tabi Bonney ft Wiz Khalifa

See also
REDi

 References 

Further readingEdge Magazine'': Jon Redwine & Robby Blackwell Interview

External links
Jon Redwine on WWW.REDSOUNDMUSIC.com

American rhythm and blues singer-songwriters
American male musicians
People from Oak Cliff, Texas
Record producers from Texas
Living people
Singer-songwriters from Texas
Musicians from Dallas
Year of birth missing (living people)
American male singer-songwriters